Evi Maltagliati (11 August 1908 – 27 April 1986) was an Italian stage, television and film actress.

Life and career 
Born in Florence as Evelina Maltagliati, she started her career at debuted in the theater just 15 years old, in the Galli-Guasti stage company. Her critical consecration came in 1933 with the role of Titania in a Max Reinhardt's representation of William Shakespeare's A Midsummer Night's Dream staged in Boboli. 

She later worked on stage with Eduardo De Filippo, Gino Cervi, Vittorio Gassman, Nino Manfredi, Sergio Tofano among others. While she had few opportunities in films, she was very active on television, in TV dramas and series. Maltagliati was married to comedian Eugenio Cappabianca.

Partial filmography

 La fanciulla dell'altro mondo (1934)
 Aldebaran (1935) - Anna Weiss
 The Two Sergeants (1936) - Marilyne Gould
 Jeanne Doré (1938) - Fanny
 Inventiamo l'amore (1938) - Anna
 I, His Father (1939) - Eva
 Il piccolo re (1939) - Lucia
 The Silent Partner (1939) - La diva
 Scandalo per bene (1940) - Bianca Alviano
 The Betrothed (1941) - La monaca di Monza detta "La Signora"
 Yes, Madam (1942) - La signora Valdata
 Il nemico (1943) - Silvia Harle
 Monte Miracolo (1945) - Gianna Fortis
 Fire Over the Sea (1947) - Dory Jane
 Daniele Cortis (1947) - Isa
 Buried Alive (1949) - Elisa
 La voce del sangue (1952)
 Noi peccatori (1953) - La madre di Lucia
 I Vinti (1953) - Claudio's mother
 Ulysses (1954) - Ulysses' Mother
 Ultima illusione (1954)
 A Woman Alone (1956) - Pressenda
 Adorabili e bugiarde (1958) - Suzy / Suzanne the Costume Designer
 Sergente d'ispezione (1958)
 The Adventures of Nicholas Nickleby (1958, TV series) - Signora Nickleby
 Il padrone delle ferriere (1959) - Marchesa di Beaulieu
 Il peccato degli anni verdi (1960) - Paolo Donati's Mother
 Madri pericolose (1960) - La contessa Alessandra Improta
 Suleiman the Conqueror (1961) - Anna, la Governante
 La tragica notte di Assisi (1961) - Ortolana
 La monaca di Monza (1962) - Badessa Inbeserco
 Le scorpion (1962)
 Imperial Venus (1962) - Madame Adelaide
 Fire Over Rome (1965) - Livia Augusta, Marcus's Mother
 The Strange Night (1967)
 The Head of the Family (1967) - Luisa
 Giacomo Casanova: Childhood and Adolescence (1969) - Serpieri
 Catch-22 (1970) - Old Woman
 Roma Bene (1971) - La madre di Elena
 This Kind of Love (1972) - madre di Federico
 The Dominici Affair (1973) - Marie Dominici

References

External links 

Actors from Florence
Italian stage actresses
Italian film actresses
Italian television actresses
1908 births
1986 deaths
20th-century Italian actresses